is the capital city of Shimane Prefecture, Japan, located in the Chūgoku region of Honshu. The city has an estimated population of 202,008 (February 1, 2021) following the merger with Higashiizumo from Yatsuka District.

Matsue is located at the northernmost point of Shimane Prefecture,  between Lake Shinji and Nakaumi on the banks of the Ohashi River connecting the two lakes, though the city proper reaches the Sea of Japan coast. Matsue is the center of the Lake Shinji-Nakaumi metropolitan area, and with a population of approximately 600,000 is the second largest on the Sea of Japan coast after Niigata and Greater Kanazawa.

Matsue is home to the  Tokugawa-era Matsue Castle, one of the last surviving feudal castles in Japan.

History 

The present-day castle town of Matsue was originally established by Horio Yoshiharu, lord of the Matsue clan, when he built Matsue castle and planned the surrounding Castle town over a five-year period from 1607 to 1611. Matsue continued to be the seat of power in the Sanin Region for many years.

Matsue was first ruled by the Horio family. Horio Yoshiharu's son Tadauji died before his father, thus the province was inherited by his grandson Tadaharu. However, Tadaharu died childless so the province was passed on to the Kyogoku. The Kyogoku were daimyō from Omi and Wakasa. Kyogoku Takatsugu served Nobunaga and Hideyoshi. Takatsugu's son Tadataka married the 4th daughter of Hidetada, Hatsu. He served in the Battle of Osaka and reportedly took 300 heads. In 1634, he received the province of Izumo, succeeding the childless Horio Tadaharu. During his rule he was instrumental in engineering projects that helped control the flow of the Hiikawa river.

In 1637, Tadataka also died childless and the domain passed to the Matsudaira. Naomasa was the third son of Hideyasu. Hideyasu, daimyō of Echizen, himself was the second son of Tokugawa Ieyasu, making Naomasa the grandson of the first Tokugawa Shōgun Ieyasu. Naomasa made a name for himself fighting in the Battle of Osaka at the age of 14. He was daimyō of Ono in Echizen and later Matsumoto in Shinano before becoming the ruler of Izumo 1638. Unlike the previous rulers Naomasa had children and his heirs managed to keep Izumo for ten generations until the end of the Edo Bakufu.
Overall, ten Matsudaira Daimyō ruled from Matsue. The most famous after the first (Matsudaira Naomasa) is the seventh, Matsudaira Harusato, more commonly referred to as Lord Fumai (不昧公). He revolutionized the administrative system of the Matsue clan which was in financial difficulties and put it back on its feet. He invested in Mulberry bushes and promoted special foods like clams that were a delicacy in Matsue. Harusato was a great enthusiast of Tea Ceremony. His Tea Ceremony name was Fumai. He founded his own school, Unshyu. He has left the Meimei-An a famous tea house still operating in Matsue. Because his influence on wagashi, Japanese sweets for Tea Ceremony from Matsue are famous, especially one called wakakusa.

The city boasts Matsue Castle, the "black castle" or "plover castle". It is one of the 12 remaining original castles in Japan. It is the second largest, the third tallest and the sixth oldest. The castle grounds include a winding path through mixed forests of bamboo, shrubs and trees, many of which are very old and identified by species. Surrounding the grounds and the castle park is the old moat, "horikawa".

Author Lafcadio Hearn taught in Matsue from 1890–1891. His house is now a museum about his life, and a popular tourist attraction in Matsue. Throughout the city there are monuments and landmarks honouring Hearn. Other museums in the city include the Shimane Art Museum and Tanabe Art Museum.

Sada Jinja in Matsue is the home to Sada Shin Noh, a sacred dance comprising a series of purification rituals related to the changing of the rush mats within the shrine. The mats are held by dancers who then offer them to deities to sit upon. Diverse dance forms are performed on a stage in the shrine accompanied by singing, flute and drums. The performance art is transmitted from generation to generation by the community. In November 2011, Sada Shin Noh was inscribed on the UNESCO Representative List of the Intangible Cultural Heritage of Humanity. Other important shrines include Yaegaki Jinja, Kamosu Jinja, and Miho Jinja, and there are the ruins of Izumo Kokubunji, an Historic Site.

Municipal timeline 
 April 1, 1889: the original city of Matsue was founded. 
 March 31, 2005: the original city of Matsue absorbed the towns of Kashima, Mihonoseki, Shimane, Shinji, Tamayu and Yatsuka, and the village of Yakumo, all from Yatsuka District, to create the new and expanded city of Matsue.
 August 1, 2011: the town of Higashiizumo (also from Yatsuka District) was merged into Matsue.
 April 1, 2018: Matsue became a core city.

Geography

Climate
Matsue has a humid subtropical climate (Köppen climate classification Cfa) with very warm summers and cool winters. Precipitation is abundant throughout the year, and is somewhat heavier in June, July and September.

Demographics
Per Japanese census data, the population of Matsue in 2020 is 203,616 people. Matsue has been conducting censuses since 1920.

Culture 
Various traditional festivals are still held, such as Dōgyōretsu, a drum parade held annually on the third Sunday of October, and Hōranenya, one of Japan's top three boat festivals that is held only once every 10 years (most recently in May 2019).

Education

Universities and colleges

 Shimane University
 Shimane Prefectural Women's College
 Matsue College of Technology
 University of Shimane Junior College

Personalities
Servant of God, Takashi Nagai (1908 -1951) was born in Matsue
Kei Nishikori (b. 1989), tennis player, was born in Matsue.
Shirō Sano (b. 1955), actor, was raised in Matsue.

International relations

International Friendship Cities
 New Orleans, Louisiana, United States, 1990 (commenced)/1994 (official agreement)
 Jilin City, Jilin, China, 1995 (commenced)/1999 (official agreement)
 Jinju, South Gyeongsang, South Korea, 1999 (official agreement)
 Hangzhou, Zhejiang, China, 1994 (commenced)/2003 (official agreement)
 Yinchuan, Ningxia, China, 1994 (commenced)/2004 (official agreement)

Sister cities
 Takarazuka, Hyōgo
 Suzu, Ishikawa
 Onomichi, Hiroshima
 Ōguchi, Aichi

Other
Although not an official friendship city of Matsue, there has been ongoing exchange with Dublin, Ireland since 1988 when former mayor Nakamura Yoshijirō visited the city.

References

External links 

 Matsue City official website 
 Official tourism page
 Matsue at Japan Guide

Cities in Shimane Prefecture
Populated places established in 2005
2005 establishments in Japan